Alexandra Langley (born 14 July 1992) is a badminton player from England. In 2011, she took the women's and mixed doubles titles at the Portugal International tournament.

Achievements

BWF International Challenge/Series (4 titles, 3 runners-up)
Women's doubles

Mixed doubles

 BWF International Challenge tournament
 BWF International Series tournament
 BWF Future Series tournament

References

External links
 

1991 births
Living people
Sportspeople from Grimsby
English female badminton players